The 1928 German football championship, the 21st edition of the competition, was won by Hamburger SV, defeating Hertha BSC, 5–2, in the final.

For Hamburger SV it was the second national championship after its first in 1923, not counting the 1922 title which the club declined. It brought to an end Hamburg's successful era during the 1920s with four appearances in the German final in seven seasons. Hamburger SV would not play in a final again until 1957 and win its next championship three years later, in 1960. For Hertha BSC it marked the third consecutive final loss, a series the club would extend to four in the following season. Hertha would then go on to win back-to-back championships in 1930 and 1931.

Hertha's Hans Grenzel and Hamburg's Tull Harder were the joint top scorer of the 1928 championship with seven goals each.

Sixteen clubs qualified for the knock-out competition, two from each of the regional federations plus an additional third club from the South and West. In all cases the regional champions and runners-up qualified. In the West the third spot went to the third-placed team of the championship while, in the South, the third spot was determined in a separate qualifying competition for runners-up and third-placed teams.

Qualified teams
The teams qualified through the regional championships:

Competition

Round of 16
The round of 16, played on 8 July 1928:

|}

Quarter-finals
The quarter finals, played on 12 July 1928:

|}

Semi-finals
The semi-finals, played on 22 July 1928:

|}

Final
The final, played on 29 July 1928:

|}

References

Sources
 kicker Allmanach 1990, by kicker, page 160 to 178 – German championship

External links
 German Championship 1927–28 at weltfussball.de 
 German Championship 1928 at RSSSF

1
German
German football championship seasons